Jake Hamon may refer to:
Jake L. Hamon Sr. (1873–1920), American oilman, attorney, and political figure
Jake L. Hamon Jr. (1902–1985), American oilman and philanthropist